Pouteria scrobiculata is a species of plant in the family Sapotaceae. It is found in Brazil and Venezuela.

References

scrobiculata
Least concern plants
Taxonomy articles created by Polbot